Ștefan Dobre (born 7 June 2001) is a Romanian professional footballer who plays as a goalkeeper.

Club career

Academica Clinceni
He made his league debut on 19 September 2021 in Liga I match against FC Arges Pitesti.

References

External links
 
 

2001 births
Living people
Sportspeople from Timișoara
Romanian footballers
Romania youth international footballers
Association football goalkeepers
Liga I players
Liga II players
FC Ripensia Timișoara players
LPS HD Clinceni players